Phoenician is an extinct Canaanite Semitic language originally spoken in the region surrounding the cities of Tyre and Sidon. Extensive Tyro-Sidonian trade and commercial dominance led to Phoenician becoming a lingua franca of the maritime Mediterranean during the Iron Age. The Phoenician alphabet spread to Greece during this period, where it became the source of all modern European scripts. 

Phoenician belongs to the Canaanite languages and as such is quite similar to Biblical Hebrew and other languages of the group, at least in its early stages and therefore mutually intelligible with them.

The area in which Phoenician was spoken includes the northern Levant and, at least as a prestige language, Anatolia, specifically the areas now including Syria, Lebanon, Western Galilee, parts of Cyprus and some adjacent areas of Turkey. It was also spoken in the area of Phoenician colonization along the coasts of the southwestern Mediterranean Sea, including those of modern Tunisia, Morocco, Libya and Algeria as well as Malta, the west of Sicily, Sardinia, Corsica, the Balearic Islands and southernmost Spain.

In modern times, the language was first decoded by Jean-Jacques Barthélemy in 1758, who noted that the name "Phoenician" was first given to the language by Samuel Bochart in his Geographia Sacra seu Phaleg et Canaan.

History
The Phoenicians were the first state-level society to make extensive use of the Semitic alphabet. The Phoenician alphabet is the oldest verified consonantal alphabet, or abjad. It has become conventional to refer to the script as "Proto-Canaanite" until the mid-11th century BC, when it is first attested on inscribed bronze arrowheads, and as "Phoenician" only after 1050 BC. The Phoenician phonetic alphabet is generally believed to be at least the partial ancestor of almost all modern alphabets.

From a traditional linguistic perspective, Phoenician was composed of a variety of dialects. According to some sources, Phoenician developed into distinct Tyro-Sidonian and Byblian dialects. By this account, the Tyro-Sidonian dialect, from which the Punic language eventually emerged, spread across the Mediterranean through trade and colonization, whereas the ancient dialect of Byblos, known from a corpus of only a few dozen extant inscriptions, played no expansionary role. However, the very slight differences in language and the insufficient records of the time make it unclear whether Phoenician formed a separate and united dialect or was merely a superficially defined part of a broader language continuum. Through their maritime trade, the Phoenicians spread the use of the alphabet to Northwest Africa and Europe, where it was adopted by the Greeks. Later, the Etruscans adopted a modified version for their own use, which, in turn, was modified and adopted by the Romans and became the Latin alphabet. In the east of the Mediterranean region, the language was in use as late as the 1st century BC, when it seems to have gone extinct there.

Punic colonisation spread Phoenician to the western Mediterranean, where the distinct Punic language developed. Punic also died out, but it seems to have survived far longer than Phoenician, until the 6th century, perhaps even into the 9th century AD.

Writing system

Phoenician was written with the Phoenician script, an abjad (consonantary) originating from the Proto-Canaanite alphabet that also became the basis for the Greek alphabet and, via an Etruscan adaptation, the Latin alphabet. The Punic form of the script gradually developed somewhat different and more cursive letter shapes; in the 3rd century BC, it also began to exhibit a tendency to mark the presence of vowels, especially final vowels, with an aleph or sometimes an ayin. Furthermore, around the time of the Second Punic War, an even more cursive form began to develop, which gave rise to a variety referred to as Neo-Punic and existed alongside the more conservative form and became predominant some time after the destruction of Carthage (c. 149 BC). Neo-Punic, in turn, tended to designate vowels with matres lectionis ("consonantal letters") more frequently than the previous systems had and also began to systematically use different letters for different vowels, in the way explained in more detail below. Finally, a number of late inscriptions from what is now Constantine, Algeria dated to the first century BC make use of the Greek alphabet to write Punic, and many inscriptions from Tripolitania, in the third and fourth centuries AD use the Latin alphabet for that purpose.

In Phoenician writing, unlike that of abjads such as those of Aramaic, Biblical Hebrew and Arabic, even long vowels remained generally unexpressed, regardless of their origin (even if they originated from diphthongs, as in bt  'house', for earlier *bayt-; Hebrew spelling has byt). Eventually, Punic writers began to implement systems of marking of vowels by means of matres lectionis. In the 3rd century BC appeared the practice of using final 'ālep  to mark the presence of any final vowel and, occasionally, of yōd  to mark a final long .

This latter system was used first with foreign words and was then extended to many native words as well.

Later, Punic inscriptions began to be written in the Latin alphabet, which also indicated the vowels. Those later inscriptions, in addition with some inscriptions in Greek letters and transcriptions of Phoenician names into other languages, represent the main source of knowledge about Phoenician vowels.

Phonology

Consonants
The following table presents the consonant phonemes of the Phoenician language as represented in the Phoenician alphabet, alongside their standard Semiticist transliteration and reconstructed phonetic values in the International Phonetic Alphabet.:

The system reflected in the abjad above is the product of several mergers. For the phonetic values of the sibilants, see below. These latter developments also occurred in Biblical Hebrew at one point or another, except that  merged into  there.

Sibilants 
The original value of the Proto-Semitic sibilants, and accordingly of their Phoenician counterparts, is disputed. Krahmalkov, too, suggests that Phoenician *z may have been [dz] or even [zd] based on Latin transcriptions such as esde for the demonstrative  z.

On the other hand, it is debated whether šīn  and sāmek , which are mostly well distinguished by the Phoenician orthography, also eventually merged at some point, either in Classical Phoenician or in Late Punic.

Postvelars 
In later Punic, the laryngeals and pharyngeals seem to have been entirely lost. Neither these nor the emphatics could be adequately represented by the Latin alphabet, but there is also evidence to that effect from Punic script transcriptions.

Lenition 
There is no consensus on whether Phoenician-Punic ever underwent the lenition of stop consonants that happened in most other Northwest Semitic languages such as Biblical Hebrew and Aramaic (cf. Hackett vs Segert and Lyavdansky). The consonant  may have been generally transformed into  in Punic and in late Phoenician, as it was in Proto-Arabic. Certainly, Latin-script renditions of late Punic include many spirantized transcriptions with ph, th and kh in various positions (although the interpretation of these spellings is not entirely clear) as well as the letter f for the original *p. However, in Neo-Punic, *b lenited to /v/ contiguous to a following consonant, as in the Latin transcription lifnim for  *lbnm "for his son".

Vowels
Knowledge of the vowel system is very imperfect because of the characteristics of the writing system. During most of its existence, Phoenician writing showed no vowels at all, and even as vowel notation systems did eventually arise late in its history, they never came to be applied consistently to native vocabulary. That must have happened earlier than in Biblical Hebrew since the resultant long vowels are not marked with the semivowel letters (bēt "house" was written  bt, in contrast to Biblical Hebrew  byt).

The most conspicuous vocalic development in Phoenician is the so-called Canaanite shift, shared by Biblical Hebrew, but going further in Phoenician. The Proto-Northwest Semitic  and  became not merely  as in Tiberian Hebrew, but . Stressed Proto-Semitic  became Tiberian Hebrew  ( in other traditions), but Phoenician . The shift is proved by Latin and Greek transcriptions like rūs/ρους for "head, cape" 𐤓𐤀𐤔 /ruːʃ/ (Tiberian Hebrew rōš /roːʃ/); similarly notice stressed  (corresponding to Tiberian Hebrew ) samō/σαμω for "he heard" 𐤔𐤌𐤏 /ʃaˈmoʕ/ (Tiberian Hebrew šāmaʻ /ʃɔːˈmaʕ/); similarly the word for "eternity" is known from Greek transcriptions to have been ūlōm/ουλομ 𐤏𐤋𐤌 /ʕuːˈloːm/, corresponding to Biblical Hebrew ʻōlām עולם /ʕoːlɔːm/ and Proto-Semitic ʻālam /ˈʕaːlam/ (in Arabic: ʻālam عالم /ˈʕaːlam/).

Suprasegmentals

Stress-dependent vowel changes indicate that stress was probably mostly final, as in Biblical Hebrew. Long vowels probably occurred only in open syllables.

Grammar
As is typical for the Semitic languages, Phoenician words are usually built around consonantal roots and vowel changes are used extensively to express morphological distinctions. However, unlike most Semitic languages, Phoenician preserved (or, possibly, re-introduced) numerous uniconsonantal and biconsonantal roots seen in Proto-Afro-Asiatic: compare the verbs 𐤊𐤍 kn "to be" vs Arabic كون kwn, 𐤌𐤕 mt "to die" vs Hebrew and Arabic מות/موت mwt and 𐤎𐤓 sr "to remove" vs Hebrew סרר srr.

Nominal morphology
Nouns are marked for gender (masculine and feminine), number (singular, plural and vestiges of the dual) and state (absolute and construct, the latter being nouns that are followed by their possessors) and also have the category definiteness. There is some evidence for remains of the Proto-Semitic genitive grammatical case as well. While many of the endings coalesce in the standard orthography, inscriptions in the Latin and Greek alphabet permit the reconstruction of the noun endings, which are also the adjective endings, as follows:

In late Punic, the final  of the feminine was apparently dropped:   "son of the queen" or   "brother of the queen" rendered in Latin as HIMILCO.  was also assimilated to following consonants: e.g. 𐤔𐤕  "year" for earlier 𐤔𐤍𐤕 .

The case endings in general must have been lost between the 9th century BC and the 7th century BC:  the personal name rendered in Akkadian as ma-ti-nu-ba-a-li "Gift of Baal", with the case endings -u and -i, was written ma-ta-an-baa-al (likely Phoenician spelling *𐤌𐤕𐤍𐤁𐤏𐤋) two centuries later. However, evidence has been found for a retention of the genitive case in the form of the first-singular possessive suffix: 𐤀𐤁𐤉  /abiya/ "of my father" vs 𐤀𐤁  /abī/ "my father". If true, this may suggest that cases were still distinguished to some degree in other forms as well.

The written forms and the reconstructed pronunciations of the personal pronouns are as follows:

Singular: 
1st: // 𐤀𐤍𐤊  (Punic sometimes 𐤀𐤍𐤊𐤉 ), also attested as //
2nd masc. // 𐤀𐤕 
2nd fem. // 𐤀𐤕 
3rd masc. // 𐤄𐤀 , also [] (?) 𐤄𐤉  and // 𐤄𐤀𐤕 
3rd fem. // 𐤄𐤀 

Plural: 
1st: // 𐤀𐤍𐤇𐤍  
2nd masc. // 𐤀𐤕𐤌 
2nd fem. unattested, perhaps // 𐤀𐤕𐤍 
3rd masc. and feminine // 𐤄𐤌𐤕 

Enclitic personal pronouns were added to nouns (to encode possession) and to prepositions, as shown below for "Standard Phoenician" (the predominant dialect, as distinct from the Byblian and the late Punic varieties). They appear in a slightly different form depending on whether or not they follow plural-form masculine nouns (and so are added after a vowel). The former is given in brackets with the abbreviation a.V.

Singular: 
1st: // , also 𐤉  (a.V. // ) 
2nd masc. // 𐤊 
2nd fem. // 𐤊 
3rd masc. // , Punic 𐤀 , (a.V. // ) 
3rd fem. // , Punic 𐤀  (a.V. // )

Plural: 
1st: // 𐤍 
2nd masc. // 𐤊𐤌 
2nd fem. unattested, perhaps // 𐤊𐤍 
3rd masc. // 𐤌  (a.V. // 𐤍𐤌 ) 
3rd fem. // 𐤌  (a.V. // 𐤍𐤌 )

Their pronunciation can then be reconstructed somewhat differently: first-person singular // 𐤉 , third-person singular masculine and feminine // 𐤉  and // 𐤉 . The third-person plural singular and feminine must have pronounced the same in both cases, i.e. // 𐤍𐤌  and // 𐤍𐤌 .

These enclitic forms vary between the dialects. In the archaic Byblian dialect, the third person forms are 𐤄 h and 𐤅 w // for the masculine singular (a.V. 𐤅 w //), 𐤄 h // for the feminine singular and 𐤅𐤌 hm // for the masculine plural. In late Punic, the 3rd masculine singular is usually // 𐤌 .

The same enclitic pronouns are also attached to verbs to denote direct objects. In that function, some of them have slightly divergent forms: first singular // 𐤍  and probably first plural //.

The near demonstrative pronouns ("this") are written, in standard Phoenician, 𐤆 z [za] for the singular and 𐤀𐤋  [ʔilːa] for the plural. Cypriot Phoenician displays 𐤀𐤆  [ʔizːa] instead of 𐤆 z [za]. Byblian still distinguishes, in the singular, a masculine  [zan] /  [za] from a feminine 𐤆𐤕  [zuːt] / 𐤆𐤀  [zuː]. There are also many variations in Punic, including 𐤎𐤕 st [suːt] and 𐤆𐤕 zt [zuːt] for both genders in the singular. The far demonstrative pronouns ("that") are identical to the independent third-person pronouns. Indefinite pronouns are "anything" is written 𐤌𐤍𐤌 mnm (possibly pronounced [miːnumːa], similar to Akkadian [miːnumːeː]) and 𐤌𐤍𐤊 mnk (possibly pronounced [miːnukːa]). The relative pronoun is a 𐤔  [ʃi], either followed or preceded by a vowel.

It was written 𐤄 h but in late Punic also 𐤀  and 𐤏  because of the weakening and coalescence of the gutturals. Much as in Biblical Hebrew, the initial consonant of the article is dropped after the prepositions 𐤁 b-, 𐤋 l- and 𐤊 k-; it could also be lost after various other particles and function words, such the direct object marker 𐤀𐤉𐤕  and the conjunction 𐤅 w- "and".

Of the cardinal numerals from 1 to 10, 1 is an adjective, 2 is formally a noun in the dual and the rest are nouns in the singular. They all distinguish gender: 𐤀𐤇𐤃, 𐤀𐤔𐤍𐤌/𐤔𐤍𐤌 (construct state 𐤀𐤔𐤍/𐤔𐤍 ), 𐤔𐤋𐤔 , 𐤀𐤓𐤁𐤏, 𐤇𐤌𐤔 , 𐤔𐤔 , 𐤔𐤁𐤏 , 𐤔𐤌𐤍/𐤔𐤌𐤍𐤄 , 𐤕𐤔𐤏 , 𐤏𐤔𐤓/𐤏𐤎𐤓 vs 𐤀𐤇𐤕, unattested, 𐤔𐤋𐤔𐤕 , 𐤀𐤓𐤁𐤏𐤕 , 𐤇𐤌𐤔𐤕 , 𐤔𐤔𐤕 , 𐤔𐤁𐤏𐤕 , 𐤔𐤌𐤍𐤕 , unattested, 𐤏𐤔𐤓𐤕 . The tens are morphologically masculine plurals of the ones: 𐤏𐤔𐤓𐤌/𐤏𐤎𐤓𐤌 , 𐤔𐤋𐤔𐤌 , 𐤀𐤓𐤁𐤏𐤌 , 𐤇𐤌𐤔𐤌 , 𐤔𐤔𐤌 , 𐤔𐤁𐤏𐤌, 𐤔𐤌𐤍𐤌 , 𐤕𐤔𐤏𐤌 . "One hundred" is 𐤌𐤀𐤕 , two hundred is its dual form , whereas the rest are formed as in 𐤌𐤀𐤕𐤌  (three hundred). One thousand is 𐤀𐤋𐤐. Ordinal numerals are formed by the addition of *iy 𐤉 . Composite numerals are formed with w- 𐤅 "and", e.g. 𐤏𐤔𐤓 𐤅𐤔𐤍𐤌  for "twelve".

Verbal morphology
The verb inflects for person, number, gender, tense and mood. Like for other Semitic languages, Phoenician verbs have different "verbal patterns" or "stems", expressing manner of action, level of transitivity and voice.
The perfect or suffix-conjugation, which expresses the past tense, is exemplified below with the root 𐤐𐤏𐤋 p-ʻ-l "to do" (a "neutral", G-stem).

Singular: 
1st: // 𐤐𐤏𐤋𐤕𐤉 
2nd masc. // 𐤐𐤏𐤋𐤕 
2nd fem. // 𐤐𐤏𐤋𐤕 
3rd masc. // 𐤐𐤏𐤋 
3rd fem. // 𐤐𐤏𐤋𐤕 , also 𐤐𐤏𐤋 , Punic 𐤐𐤏𐤋𐤀 

Plural: 
1st: // 𐤐𐤏𐤋𐤍  
2nd masc. // 𐤐𐤏𐤋𐤕𐤌 
2nd fem. unattested, perhaps // 𐤐𐤏𐤋𐤕𐤍 
3rd masc. // 𐤐𐤏𐤋 , Punic 𐤐𐤏𐤋𐤀 
3rd fem. // 𐤐𐤏𐤋 , Punic 𐤐𐤏𐤋𐤀 

The imperfect or prefix-conjugation, which expresses the present and future tense (and which is not distinguishable from the descendant of the Proto-Semitic jussive expressing wishes), is exemplified below, again with the root p-ʻ-l.

1st: // 𐤀𐤐𐤏𐤋 
2nd masc. // 𐤕𐤐𐤏𐤋 
2nd fem. // 𐤕𐤐𐤏𐤋𐤉 
3rd masc. // 𐤉𐤐𐤏𐤋 
3rd fem. // 𐤕𐤐𐤏𐤋 
Plural:
1st: // 𐤍𐤐𐤏𐤋 
2nd masc. // 𐤕𐤐𐤏𐤋 , Punic 𐤕𐤐𐤏𐤋𐤀 
2nd fem. // 𐤕𐤐𐤏𐤋𐤍 
3rd masc. // 𐤉𐤐𐤏𐤋 
3rd fem. *// 𐤉𐤐𐤏𐤋𐤍 

The old Semitic jussive, which originally differed slightly from the prefix conjugation, is no longer possible to separate from it in Phoenician with the present data.

The non-finite forms are the infinitive construct, the infinitive absolute and the active and passive participles. In the G-stem, the infinitive construct is usually combined with the preposition 𐤋 l- "to", as in 𐤋𐤐𐤏𐤋  "to do"; in contrast, the infinitive absolute 𐤐𐤏𐤋 (paʻōl) is mostly used to strengthen the meaning of a subsequent finite verb with the same root: 𐤐𐤕𐤇 𐤕𐤐𐤕𐤇  "you will indeed open!", accordingly /𐤐𐤏𐤋 𐤕𐤐𐤏𐤋 / "you will indeed do!".

The participles had, in the G-stem, the following forms: 
Active: 
Masculine singular // later // 𐤐𐤏𐤋 , plural // or // 𐤐𐤏𐤋𐤌 
Feminine singular  𐤐𐤏𐤋𐤕 , plural  𐤐𐤏𐤋𐤕  
Passive: 
Masculine singular // or // 𐤐𐤏𐤋 , plural // 𐤐𐤏𐤋𐤌 
Feminine singular // 𐤐𐤏𐤋𐤕 , plural // 𐤐𐤏𐤋𐤕 

The missing forms above can be inferred from the correspondences between the Proto-Northwest Semitic ancestral forms and the attested Phoenician counterparts: the PNWS participle forms are *.

The derived stems are:
 the N-stem (functioning as a passive), e.g. // 𐤍𐤐𐤏𐤋 npʻl, the N-formant being lost in the prefix conjugation while assimilating and doubling the first root consonant 𐤉𐤐𐤏𐤋 (ypʻl).
 the D-stem (functioning as a factitive): the forms must have been 𐤐𐤏𐤋 /piʻʻil/ in the suffix conjugation, 𐤉𐤐𐤏𐤋 /yapaʻʻil/ in the prefix conjugation, 𐤐𐤏𐤋 /paʻʻil/ in the imperative and the infinitive construct, 𐤐𐤏𐤋 /paʻʻōl/ in the infinitive absolute and 𐤌𐤐𐤏𐤋 /mapaʻʻil/ in the participle. The characteristic doubling of the middle consonant is only identifiable in foreign alphabet transcriptions.
 the C-stem (functioning as a causative): the original 𐤄 *ha- prefix has produced 𐤉 *yi- rather than the Hebrew ה *hi-. The forms were apparently 𐤉𐤐𐤏𐤋 /yipʻil/ in the suffix conjugation 𐤀𐤐𐤏𐤋(/ in late Punic), 𐤉𐤐𐤏𐤋 /yapʻil/ in the prefix conjugation, and the infinitive is also 𐤉𐤐𐤏𐤋 /yapʻil/, while the participle was probably 𐤌𐤐𐤏𐤋 /mapʻil/ or, in late Punic at least, 𐤌𐤐𐤏𐤋 /mipʻil/.

Most of the stems apparently also had passive and reflexive counterparts, the former differing through vowels, the latter also through the infix 𐤕 -t-. The G stem passive is attested as 𐤐𐤉𐤏𐤋 pyʻl,  < *; t-stems can be reconstructed as 𐤉𐤕𐤐𐤏𐤋 ytpʻl /yitpaʻil/ (tG) and 𐤉𐤕𐤐𐤏𐤋 yptʻʻl /yiptaʻʻil/ (Dt).

Prepositions and particles
Some prepositions are always prefixed to nouns, deleting, if present, the initial  of the definite article: such are 𐤁 b- "in", 𐤋 l- "to, for", 𐤊 k- "as" and 𐤌 m- // "from". They are sometimes found in forms extended through the addition of 𐤍 -n or 𐤕 -t. Other prepositions are not like that: 𐤀𐤋 "upon", .𐤏𐤃  "until", 𐤀𐤇𐤓  "after", 𐤕𐤇𐤕  "under", 𐤁𐤉𐤍, 𐤁𐤍  "between". New prepositions are formed with nouns: 𐤋𐤐𐤍 lpn "in front of", from 𐤋 l- "to" and 𐤐𐤍 pn "face". There is a special preposited marker of a definite object 𐤀𐤉𐤕  (//?), which, unlike Hebrew, is clearly distinct from the preposition את  (//).

The most common negative marker is 𐤁𐤋  (//), negating verbs but sometimes also nouns; another one is 𐤀𐤉  (//), expressing both nonexistence and the negation of verbs. Negative commands or prohibitions are expressed with 𐤀𐤋  (//). "Lest" is 𐤋𐤌 . Some common conjunctions are 𐤅  (originally perhaps //, but certainly // in Late Punic), "and" 𐤀𐤌 , "when", and 𐤊 , "that; because; when". There was also a conjunction 𐤀𐤐/𐤐  ("also". 𐤋  (//) could (rarely) be used to introduce desiderative constructions ("may he do X!"). 𐤋  could also introduce vocatives. Both prepositions and conjunctions could form compounds.

Syntax
The basic word order is verb-subject-object. There is no verb "to be" in the present tense; in clauses that would have used a copula, the subject may come before the predicate. Nouns precede their modifiers, such as adjectives and possessors.

Vocabulary and word formation
Most nouns are formed by a combination of consonantal roots and vocalic patterns, but they can be formed also with prefixes (𐤌 , expressing actions or their results, and rarely 𐤕 ) and suffixes . Abstracts can be formed with the suffix 𐤕 -t (probably). Adjectives can be formed following the familiar Semitic nisba suffix  𐤉 y 𐤑𐤃𐤍𐤉 (e.g. ṣdny "Sidonian").

Like the grammar, the vocabulary is very close to Biblical Hebrew, but some peculiarities attract attention. For example, the copula verb "to be" is 𐤊𐤍 kn (as in Arabic, as opposed to Hebrew and Aramaic היה hyh) and the verb "to do" is 𐤐𐤏𐤋 pʿl (as in Aramaic פעל pʿl and Arabic فعل fʿl, as opposed to Hebrew עשה ʿśh, though in Hebrew פעל pʿl has the similar meaning "to act").

Survival and influences of Punic

The significantly divergent later form of the language that was spoken in the Tyrian Phoenician colony of Carthage is known as Punic and remained in use there for considerably longer than Phoenician did in Phoenicia itself by arguably surviving into Augustine of Hippo's time. Throughout its existence, Punic  co-existed with the Berber languages, which were then  native to Tunisia (including Carthage) and North Africa. Punic disappeared some time after the destruction of Carthage by the Romans and the Berbers. It is possible that Punic may have survived the Muslim conquest of the Maghreb in some small isolated area: the geographer al-Bakri describes a people speaking a language that was not Berber, Latin or Coptic in the city of Sirte in rural Ifriqiya, a region in which spoken Punic survived well past its written use. However, it is likely that arabization of the Punics was facilitated by their language belonging to the same group (both being Semitic languages) as that of the conquerors and thus having many grammatical and lexical similarities. Most Punic speakers may have been linguistically Berberized and/or Latinized after the fall of Carthage.

The ancient Libyco-Berber alphabet that is still in irregular use by modern Berber groups such as the Tuareg is known by the native name Tifinagh, possibly a derived form of a cognate of the name "Punic". Still, a direct derivation from the Phoenician-Punic script is debated and far from established since the two writing systems are very different. As far as language (not the script) is concerned, some borrowings from Punic appear in modern Berber dialects: one interesting example is agadir "wall" from Punic gader.

Perhaps the most interesting case of Punic influence is that of the name of Hispania (the Iberian Peninsula, comprising Portugal and Spain), which, according to one of the theories, is derived from the Punic I-Shaphan meaning "coast of hyraxes", in turn a misidentification on the part of Phoenician explorers of its numerous rabbits as hyraxes. Another case is the name of a tribe of hostile "hairy people" that Hanno the Navigator found in the Gulf of Guinea. The name given to those people by Hanno the Navigator's interpreters was transmitted from Punic into Greek as gorillai and was applied in 1847 by Thomas S. Savage to the western gorilla.

Surviving examples
Phoenician, together with Punic, is primarily known from approximately 10,000 surviving inscriptions, supplemented by occasional glosses in books written in other languages. In addition to their many inscriptions, the Phoenicians are believed to have left numerous other types of written sources, but most have not survived.

Roman authors, such as Sallust, allude to some books written in the Punic language, but none have survived except occasionally in translation (e.g., Mago's treatise) or in snippets (e.g., in Plautus' plays). The Cippi of Melqart, a bilingual inscription in Ancient Greek and Carthaginian discovered in Malta in 1694, was the key which allowed French scholar Jean-Jacques Barthélemy to decipher and reconstruct the alphabet in 1758. Even as late as 1837 only 70 Phoenician inscriptions were known to scholars. These were compiled in Wilhelm Gesenius's Scripturae linguaeque Phoeniciae monumenta, which comprised all that was known of Phoenician by scholars at that time.
Some key surviving inscriptions of Phoenician are:

Ahiram sarcophagus
Bodashtart inscriptions
Çineköy inscription
Cippi of Melqart
Mdina Steles
Eshmunazar II sarcophagus
Karatepe
Kilamuwa Stela
Nora Stone
Pyrgi Tablets
Temple of Eshmun

Since bilingual tablets with inscriptions in both Etruscan and Phoenician dating from around 500 BC were found in 1964, more Etruscan has been deciphered through comparison to the more fully understood Phoenician.

See also
Punic language
Phoenician alphabet
Extinct language
List of extinct languages of Asia
Phoenician-Punic literature

References

Sources

Further reading

Fox, Joshua. "A Sequence of Vowel Shifts in Phoenician and Other Languages." Journal of Near Eastern Studies 55, no. 1 (1996): 37-47. https://www.jstor.org/stable/545378.
Holmstedt, Robert D., and Aaron Schade. Linguistic Studies In Phoenician: In Memory of J. Brian Peckham. Winona Lake, IN: Eisenbrauns, 2013.
Krahmalkov, Charles R. A Phoenician-Punic Grammar. Leiden: Brill, 2001.
Schmitz, Philip C. "Phoenician-Punic Grammar and Lexicography in the New Millennium." Journal of the American Oriental Society 124, no. 3 (2004): 533-47. 
Segert, S. A Grammar of Phoenician and Punic. München: C.H. Beck, 1976.
 
Tomback, Richard S. A Comparative Semitic Lexicon of the Phoenician and Punic Languages. Missoula, MT: Scholars Press for the Society of Biblical Literature, 1978.
Tribulato, Olga. Language and Linguistic Contact In Ancient Sicily. Cambridge: Cambridge University Press, 2012.
Woodard, Roger D. The Ancient Languages of Syria-Palestine and Arabia. Cambridge: Cambridge University Press, 2008.

 
Phoenician inscriptions
Canaanite languages
Extinct languages of Asia
Languages attested from the 11th century BC
Languages extinct in the 5th century BC
Languages with own distinct writing systems
Languages of Sicily